Dungen is the first album by the Swedish psychedelic rock group Dungen.

It was originally released in 2001 by Subliminal Sounds on a limited vinyl edition of 500 copies. After high demand, the album was finally released on CD with some extra material in 2005 and renamed Dungen 1999-2001.

The album contains early versions of some songs found on Dungen's second studio album.

Track listing (LP version)
All tracks by Gustav Ejstes
"Stadsvandringar" (City Walks) - 6:16
"Och solen stiger upp" (And the Sun Rises) - 4:35
"Andra sidan sjön" (Other Side of the Lake) - 7:35
"Mitten av mars" (Middle of March) - 3:08
"Du och jag..." (You and Me...) - 3:34
"Och du frågar mig varför ... " (And You Ask Me Why...) - 3:29
"Tillsammans" (Together) - 3:30
"Känslan som gror" (The Feeling That Grows) - 4:38

Track listing (CD version)
"Stadsvandringar" (City Walks) - 14:49
"Midsommarbongen" (The Midsummer Bong) - 18:34
"Lilla vännen" (The Little Friend) - 11:37

Personnel 
Carl Abrahamsson – cover design
Fredrik Björling – percussion, drums
Dungen – compilation
Gustav Ejstes – bass guitar, flute, guitar, violin, arranger, drums, keyboards, vocals, producer
Reine Fiske – bass guitar, guitar, percussion
Stefan Kéry – executive producer, photography, cover design
Marie Ljungsten – photography
Marco Lohikari – bass guitar
Christopher Schlee – guitar
Gila Storm – vocals
Alex Wiig – percussion, sitar

Sources

2001 albums
Dungen albums